Wayne Morris (born 19 July 1947) is a former  Australian rules footballer who played with South Melbourne in the Victorian Football League (VFL). Wayne won 4 club best and fairests with WMFC (1974, 1975, 1976, 1978) and 3 league best and fairests with YVMDFL (1975, 1976, 1978). Wayne played with Sale during enlistment with RAAF, then Longwarry. At 31 Wayne retired to circumvent on-field injury foreclosing his career as a timber miller. To escape repressive Victorian winters, a timber mill near Gympie Qld was acquired, whilst domiciled in Noosa Junction. The mill is now run by a daughter and son-in-law. Wayne is now retired and re-domiciled in Noosa Heads, golf his passion.

Notes

External links 

Living people
1947 births
Australian rules footballers from Victoria (Australia)
Sydney Swans players